Bolla Conradie (born 24 February 1978) is a South African rugby union footballer.

See also
List of South Africa national rugby union players – Springbok no. 724

References

External links
Stormers profile

1978 births
Living people
South African rugby union players
Cape Coloureds
Stormers players
Western Province (rugby union) players
Boland Cavaliers players
South Africa international rugby union players
Rugby union scrum-halves
Sportspeople from Cape Town
South Africa international rugby sevens players